The 2015 CONCACAF Awards is the third year for CONCACAF's awards for the top region football players, coaches and referees of the year. The shortlists were published on 12 January 2016. The results were announced on 22 January 2016.

The eligibility criteria for these awards is:
 Have played/coached/refereed in an official CONCACAF tournament at club or national team level OR
 Have played/coached/refereed for a CONCACAF member national team in a FIFA-sanctioned international competition OR
 Have played/coached/refereed in a domestic league within CONCACAF territory

Notes:

Female awards

Player of the Year

Goalkeeper of the Year

Coach of the Year

Referee of the Year

Best XI

GK
Hope Solo (GK/USA), Seattle Reign (USA)
DF
Kenti Robles (DF/MEX), Atlético Madrid (ESP);
Becky Sauerbrunn (DF/USA), FC Kansas City (USA);
Lixy Rodriguez (DF/CRC), UCEM Alajuela (CRC);
Diana Saenz (DF/CRC), University of South Florida (USA)
MF
Carli Lloyd (MF/USA), Houston Dash (USA);
Shirley Cruz (MF/CRC), Paris Saint-Germain (FRA);
Katherine Alvarado (MF/CRC), Saprissa (CRC);
Verónica Pérez (MF/MEX), Canberra United (AUS)
FW
Alex Morgan (FW/USA), Orlando Pride (USA);
Raquel Rodríguez (FW/CRC), Penn State University (USA)

Male awards

Player of the Year

Goalkeeper of the Year

Coach of the Year

Referee of the Year

Best XI

GK
Tim Howard (GK/USA); Everton (ENG)
DF
Román Torres (DF/PAN), Seattle Sounders (USA)
Giancarlo González (DF/CRC), Palermo (ITA)
Héctor Moreno (DF/MEX), PSV (NED)
Miguel Layún (DF/MEX), Porto (POR)
MF
Andrés Guardado (MF/MEX), PSV (NED);
Michael Bradley (MF/USA), Toronto FC (CAN)
Joel Campbell (MF/CRC), Arsenal (ENG)
Jesús Corona (MF/MEX), Porto (POR)
FW
Javier Hernández (FW/MEX), Bayer Leverkusen (GER)
Bryan Ruiz (FW/CRC), Sporting CP (POR)

Mixed-sex

Goal of the Year
Goal of the Year applies only to goals scored during CONCACAF or FIFA official competitions or a league game disputed within the CONCACAF region;

References 

CONCACAF trophies and awards
Awards
CONCACAF